Mohammad Asif (born 11 November 1973) is a Pakistani cricket umpire. He has stood in domestic matches in the 2017–18 Quaid-e-Azam Trophy and the 2016–17 Regional One Day Cup. In December 2018, he was one of the on-field umpires for the final of the 2018–19 Quaid-e-Azam Trophy.

References

External links
 

1973 births
Living people
Pakistani cricket umpires